Snezhnogorsk is the name of several urban localities in Russia:
Snezhnogorsk, Murmansk Oblast, a town under the administrative jurisdiction of the closed administrative-territorial formation of Alexandrovsk in Murmansk Oblast
Snezhnogorsk, Krasnoyarsk Krai, a work settlement under the administrative jurisdiction of Tsentralny City District of the krai city of Norilsk in Krasnoyarsk Krai